"Heartline" is a song by British singer Craig David. It was written by David, Jonas Blue, and Sam Romans and produced by Blue for his seventh studio album, The Time Is Now (2018). The song was released as the album's lead single on 14 September 2017.

Background
On 15 September 2017, David announced "Heartline" as the lead single from his upcoming seventh studio album, The Time Is Now, set to be released on 26 January 2018. "Heartline" is an R&B song with influences of electronic music, with a "bright" tune like "Ain't Giving Up", his previous single.

Music video
The music video of the song was released on David's official YouTube account on 18 October 2017. Directed by Charlie Sarsfield, it was filmed in Ibiza.

Track listing

Charts

Certifications

Release history

References

2017 songs
Songs written by Craig David
Craig David songs
2017 singles
Songs written by Romans (musician)
Sony Music singles
Songs written by Jonas Blue